Vice admiral is a flag officer rank of the British Royal Navy and equates to the NATO rank code OF-8. It is immediately superior to the rear admiral rank and is subordinate to the full admiral rank. Naval personnel could be advanced to the rank of vice-admiral, normally from rear-admiral, whilst on active service, on the Reserved List (liable to be recalled to duty at short notice) or on the Retired List

The Royal Navy has had vice admirals since at least the 16th century. When the fleet was deployed, the vice admiral would be in the leading portion or van, acting as the deputy to the admiral.

Serving Vice Admirals
Christopher Gardner (promoted 2019)
Keith Blount (promoted 2019)
Richard Thompson (promoted 2020)
Guy Robinson (promoted 2021)
Andrew Burns (promoted 2021)
Martin Connell (promoted 2022)
List of serving senior officers of the Royal Navy

List of Vice Admirals

See also
 List of senior officers of the Royal Navy
 List of Royal Navy admirals
 List of Royal Navy rear admirals
 List of British Army full generals

References

External links
 List of Royal Navy Senior Staff

Vice admirals
 
Lists of admirals